The Dharmacracy Party is a Cambodian political party founded and registered in 1998. Its president is Pothidey Savadey. It was formerly known as the Dharmacracy Women and Nation Party.

References

External links

1998 establishments in Cambodia
Buddhist democratic parties
Buddhist socialism
Political parties established in 1998
Political parties in Cambodia
Social democratic parties in Cambodia